Dirfys-Messapia is a municipality in the Euboea regional unit, Central Greece, Greece. The seat of the municipality is the town Psachna. The municipality has an area of 777.420 km2.

Municipality
The municipality Dirfys-Messapia was formed at the 2011 local government reform by the merger of the following 2 former municipalities, that became municipal units:
Dirfys
Messapia

References

Municipalities of Central Greece
Populated places in Euboea